Hank McGregor (born 24 January 1978) is a South African marathon canoeist and surf ski racer. He has won eleven gold medals at the ICF Canoe Marathon World Championships.

References

External links
 Canoeicf.com
 Canoeicf.com
 Resultsdata.deltatiming.com
 sport24.co.za results 2016

1978 births
Living people
South African male canoeists
Medalists at the ICF Canoe Marathon World Championships